Duhour is a French surname. Notable people with the surname include:

Clément Duhour (1911–1983), French shot putter, actor, and director
Édouard Duhour (1905–1969), French shot putter, brother of Clément

See also
Dufour (surname)

French-language surnames